Coleman Street is one of the 25 ancient wards of the City of London and lies on the City's northern boundary with the London Borough of Islington.

The ward, which includes land lying on either side of the former city wall, takes its name from a road linking Gresham Street with the London Wall road.

The ward 
Modern ward boundary changes, particularly those of 2003, have much altered the extent of city wards, so that many no longer closely correlate to their historic areas.

Coleman Street is a very busy ward, it has its own long established ward club and newsletter.

Etymology
The ward takes its name from Coleman Street, which took its name from the charcoal burners who occupied the area in medieval times.

Historic Ward

The first mention of the Ward appears to have been in 1130, but at that time it was common practice to use the name of the ward Alderman to refer to the ward. In the 1130 survey, Coleman Street Ward is thought to correspond to Warda Haconis.

The Ward contains areas both outside and inside the line of the City’s former defensive walls. There was no local gate through the wall until Moorgate, previously a small postern, was built in 1511. Abraham Cowley's 1661 Restoration comedy The Cutter of Coleman Street refers to the area.

It appears that the area outside, the once very marshy Lower and Little Moorfields (now mostly occupied by Finsbury Circus and the surrounding buildings), previously part of the Soke of Cripplegate and then the Manor of Finsbury, was added in the 17th century, though it was not developed until 1817.

The Walbrook, known at this point as Deepditch and running on the line of modern Blomfield Street, formed the eastern boundary of Lower Moorfields and the line continues to form the eastern boundary of the part of the ward lying north of the former wall, with the extra-mural ward of Bishopsgate Without lying east of the brook, and the road which now covers it. This section of the Walbrook, around Blomfield Street, was the focus of the phenomena of the Walbrook Skulls, resulting from the immense quantities of Roman-era human heads that were deposited in the river. These are still regularly uncovered during building work.

Post 2003 Ward
Coleman Street borders six other wards and occupies an irregular shape of land bounded to the north by Chiswell Street and Eldon Street; to the east by Blomfield Street, Copthall Avenue and a section of Moorgate; to the south by Lothbury and Gresham Street; and to the west by Basinghall Street, Coleman Street itself, Moor Lane and Silk Street.

Politics
Coleman Street is one of 25 wards in the City of London, each electing an alderman to the Court of Aldermen and  commoners (the City equivalent of a councillor) to the Court of Common Council of the City of London Corporation. Only electors who are Freemen of the City are eligible to stand. The Alderman is Peter Estlin and the Common Councilmen are Michael Cassidy, Sophie Fernandes, Stuart Fraser and Andrew McMurtrie.

Warren Stormes Hale, Lord Mayor of London in 1864, was the ward's most notable civic dignitary.

Features 

Coleman Street is a one-way road that runs from Gresham Street to London Wall. The church of St Stephen Coleman Street used to stand at the southern end of the street, on the western side, until it was completely destroyed in the Blitz and was not rebuilt. In the 17th century, St. Stephen's became a Puritan stronghold. On the night of 5 January 1642, after the king's failed attempt to arrest them, five MPs, Pym, Hampden, Haselrig, Strode and Holles, hid on Coleman Street utilising the support for parliament that tended to be afforded by sympathisers in the City of London.

At the northern end of the street stands the livery hall of the Worshipful Company of Armourers and Brasiers, and the pineapple-shaped headquarters of Legal & General.

Despite the bustle of business, the ward also contains the City’s "finest oasis of calm", 
Finsbury Circus, an elliptical square with its own bowling club, is located within the ward, as is Moorgate station.

References

External links

 City of London Corporation Coleman Street ward boundaries (2003 —)
 Map of Early Modern London:  Coleman Street Ward - Historical Map and Encyclopedia of Shakespeare's London (Scholarly)
 Coleman Street Ward Club - A Social Club based in the City of London

Wards of the City of London
Streets in the City of London